Murd-e Ghaffar (also Romanized as Mūrd-e Ghaffār and Moord Ghaffar; also known as Boneh-ye Mordeh Ghaffār, Boneh-ye Mūrt Ghaffār, and Bunneh Mūrdah Ghaffār) is a village in Holayjan Rural District, in the Central District of Izeh County, Khuzestan Province, Iran. At the 2006 census, its population was 88, in 18 families.

References 

Populated places in Izeh County